The 2012 Party Rock Open was a professional tennis tournament played on hard courts. It is the fourth edition of the tournament which is part of the 2012 ITF Women's Circuit. It took place in Las Vegas, United States on September 24–30, 2012.

WTA entrants

Seeds 

 1 Rankings are as of September 17, 2012.

Other entrants 
The following players received wildcards into the singles main draw:
  Samantha Crawford
  Chelsey Gullickson
  Asia Muhammad
  Allie Will

The following players received entry from the qualifying draw:
  Gabriela Dabrowski
  Jennifer Elie
  Adriana Pérez
  Arina Rodionova

Champions

Singles 

  Lauren Davis def.  Shelby Rogers, 6–7(5–7), 6–2, 6–2

Doubles 

  Anastasia Rodionova /  Arina Rodionova def.  Elena Bovina /  Edina Gallovits-Hall, 6–2, 2–6, [10–6]

External links 
 2012 Party Rock Open at ITFTennis.com
 Official site

 
Party Rock Open
Party Rock Open
2012 in American tennis